Bivariate may refer to:

Mathematics
 Bivariate function, a function of two variables
 Bivariate polynomial, a polynomial of two indeterminates

Statistics
 Bivariate data, that shows the relationship between two variables
 Bivariate analysis, statistical analysis of two variables
 Bivariate distribution, a joint probability distribution for two variables

Other

 Bivariate map, a single map that displays two variables

See also
 Two-dimensional curve
 Multivariate (disambiguation)